Climate Justice Now! (CJN!) is a global coalition of networks and organizations campaigning for climate justice.

The coalition was founded at the 2007 UNFCCC meeting in Bali, and has since mobilised for UNFCCC meetings in Bangkok, Copenhagen and Cancun.

Members

CJN! list its members and allies on its website as: 
 Asia Pacific Forum on Women, Law and Development (APWLD)
 Carbon Trade Watch
 Center for Environmental Concerns
 Centre for Environmental Justice, Sri Lanka
 Canadian Youth Climate Coalition/Coalition canadienne des jeunes pour le climat
 Earth in Brackets
 Earth Peoples
 Ecologistas en Acción
 Ecological Alert and Recovery-Thailand (EARTH)
 Focus on the Global South
 Freedom from Debt Coalition, Philippines
 Friends of the Earth International
 Friends of the Earth U.S
 GAIA: Global Anti-Incinerator Alliance and Global Alliance for Incinerator Alternatives
 Global Exchange
 Global Forest Coalition
 Global Justice Ecology Project
 Gendercc – Women for Climate Justice
 IBONinternational
 Institute for Agriculture and Trade Policy (IATP)
 Institute for Policy Studies (IPS)
 International Forum on Globalization
 Kalikasan-Peoples Network for the Environment (Kalikasan-PNE)
 La Via Campesina International Peasant Movement
 Members of the Durban Group for Climate Justice
 Oilwatch
 Pacific Indigenous Peoples Environment Coalition, Aotearoa/New Zealand
 Sustainable Energy and Economy Network
 The Indigenous Environmental Network
 The International Institute of Climate Action & Theory
 The People's Coalition for Fisheries Justice-Indonesia (KIARA)
 Thai Working Group for Climate Justice (TCJ)
 Tibet Justice Center
 Timberwatch Coalition
The Global Alliance of Indigenous Peoples and Local Communities against REDD 
 WALHI/Friends of the Earth Indonesia
 World Rainforest Movement
 Quaker Earthcare Witness

References

External links
 Statement of principles
 Homepage as archived August 29, 2015, at the Wayback Machine.

International climate change organizations
Friends of the Earth